The 2022 World Orienteering Championships were held from 26 to 30 June 2022 in the Triangle Region, Denmark. This was the first World Orienteering Championships with only sprint races, and the first to include a knock-out sprint event.

Schedule

Medal summary

Medal table

Men

Women

Mixed

References

External links
 Official website

World Orienteering Championships
World Championships
World Orienteering Championships
World Orienteering Championships
International sports competitions hosted by Denmark